James Edgar Collins (born November 5, 1973) is an American former professional basketball player whose last team was Indesit Fabriano of the Italian second division (Serie A2) in 2006–07 season.

Career
He attended Florida State University and was selected 36th overall by the Philadelphia 76ers in the 1997 NBA draft. He played one season in the NBA for the Los Angeles Clippers in 1997–98, who had obtained him from the 76ers by trading the rights to a 1998 second round pick (used to select Jelani McCoy). He has also been briefly signed by the Phoenix Suns in 1999, Washington Wizards in 1999 and Memphis Grizzlies in 2001, but has not played any NBA games for those teams. Collins played for the Grand Rapids Hoops of the Continental Basketball Association (CBA) from 2000 to 2002 and earned All-CBA First Team honors in 2002.

Before Fabriano, he has played in Spain for Pinturas Bruguer and Italy in Serie A for Air Avellino (2002–2003) and Vertical Vision Cantù (2006) and Serie A2 for Eurorida Scafati (2003–2004) and Cimberio Novara (2004–2006).

Collins, currently is the Head Boys Basketball Coach at Andrew Jackson High School in Jacksonville, Florida.

References

External links
 
NBA & college stats @ databasebasketball.com

1973 births
Living people
African-American basketball players
American expatriate basketball people in France
American expatriate basketball people in Italy
American expatriate basketball people in Spain
American expatriate basketball people in Venezuela
American men's basketball players
Basketball players from Jacksonville, Florida
Florida State Seminoles men's basketball players
Grand Rapids Hoops players
Guaiqueríes de Margarita players
Joventut Badalona players
La Crosse Bobcats players
Liga ACB players
Los Angeles Clippers players
Pallacanestro Cantù players
Parade High School All-Americans (boys' basketball)
Philadelphia 76ers draft picks
Quad City Thunder players
Scafati Basket players
Shooting guards
SIG Basket players
21st-century African-American sportspeople
20th-century African-American sportspeople